Salix phylicifolia, the tea-leaved willow, is a species of willow native to Northern Europe including Iceland, the Faroe Islands, Scandinavia, Finland, Russia, and Western Siberia. It was the first bush found on the new volcanic island of Surtsey near Iceland.

Description 

External links

phylicifolia
Flora of Europe
Flora of Iceland
Flora of the Faroe Islands
Flora of Finland
Flora of Russia
Flora of Siberia
Plants described in 1753
Taxa named by Carl Linnaeus